Çılgın Kız ve Üç Süper Adam is a 1973 Turkish film directed by Cavit Yürüklü.

The film is also known as 3 Supermen and Mad Girl (American informal English title).

Plot summary

Cast 
Levent Çakır
Altan Bozkurt
Yeşim Yükselen
Nubar Terziyan
Nuri Kırgeç
Mine Sun

Soundtrack

External links 

1973 films
1970s science fiction action films
Turkish science fiction action films
1970s Turkish-language films
Turkish superhero films
1970s superhero films